Nordin Gerzić (born 9 November 1983) is a Swedish former footballer who played as a midfielder. He ended his career in December 2021.

Club career
Gerzić left Bosnia and Herzegovina and arrived in Sweden at the age of seven or eight. He started his football career in Eskilstuna City, where he played between 1994 and 1997 before signing with Örebro SK, in the start of 2000, he was given a trial with German side Bayern Munich, but he failed to impress and returned home to Örebro. In 2003, he went on loan to Rynninge IK and eventually signed for the club. He played there for two seasons, during his time there, he was named "Best Forward" in Division 2 Östra Svealand. In 2007, he returned to Örebro SK.

International career
After featuring for the Bosnia and Herzegovina U-16 team, he switched allegiance and made his senior debut for Sweden in a January 2011 friendly match against Botswana and has earned a total of 2 caps, scoring no goals. His second and final international came three days later in a friendly against South Africa.

Career statistics

Club

A.  Statistics between 2004 and 2006 are not included due to lack of information.

International

References

External links
 

1983 births
Living people
People from Gradiška, Bosnia and Herzegovina
Swedish people of Bosnia and Herzegovina descent
Association football midfielders
Bosnia and Herzegovina footballers
Bosnia and Herzegovina youth international footballers
Swedish footballers
Sweden international footballers
Örebro SK players
Rynninge IK players
IFK Göteborg players
Allsvenskan players
Superettan players
Division 2 (Swedish football) players